Mod league is a form of rugby league developed by the Australian Rugby League. It was developed to introduce children to rugby league. 

Mod league follows on from mini football; it introduces laws more common to the full international laws of rugby league, whilst also keeping the theme of being an introductory level. It is a necessary bridge between mini footy and the full rigours of international rugby league laws.

Similarities with Mini footy

Tackles below the armpits
Code of Conduct and safe play code enforced 
Every player must play a minimum of one unbroken half of football in each match 
Nationally accredited coaches, referees and first aid officers

Changes to bridge the gap between mini footy to rugby league
Kicking (without bombs) 
 40-minute halves ages 8,7,6
Maximum number of players per team on the field at once is 11 at ages 9, 10, 11 and 13 at age 12 
6 tackles

Junior rugby league
Variations of rugby league
Sports originating in Australia